Janna Lea Thompson  (1942–2022) was an American-born philosopher and ethicist, who spent the majority of her academic career in Melbourne, Australia. She is best known for her work on reparative and intergenerational justice.

Early life and education 
Janna Lea Thompson was born on 12 November 1942 in Fairbault, Minnesota, USA. She graduated from the University of Minnesota with a Bachelor of Arts degree in 1964 and won a Marshall Plan scholarship which took her to the University of Oxford where she completed a Bachelor of Philosophy in 1966.

Career 
Following her graduation, Thompson lectured at the University of Manchester from 1966 to 1970. Next, she moved to Melbourne, Australia to take up a lectureship at Monash University in 1970. While there she undertook a Diploma of Education (tertiary studies). She then joined La Trobe University as a lecturer (1975–1981) and was promoted to senior lecturer (1981–2000) and reader/associate professor (2000–2007), before being made professor (2007–2012).

Thompson died in Melbourne on 24 June 2022, just months following diagnosis of brain tumours.

Honours and recognition 
In 2001 Thompson was elected a Fellow of the Australian Academy of the Humanities and of the Australian Academy of the Social Sciences in 2011. She was awarded the Eureka Prize for Research in Ethics in 2006.

Writing 

In addition to her books and peer-reviewed journal articles, Thompson contributed to The Conversation and Inside Story and reviewed books for Australian Book Review.

She wrote her final book, Lockdown, during the COVID-19 pandemic. A detective novel, it was launched posthumously.

As author

As editor

References 

1942 births
2022 deaths
Fellows of the Australian Academy of the Humanities
Fellows of the Academy of the Social Sciences in Australia
University of Minnesota alumni
Alumni of the University of Oxford
Academic staff of Monash University
Academic staff of La Trobe University